Federico Brancolini (born 14 July 2001) is an Italian professional footballer who plays as a goalkeeper for  club Lecce.

Club career
Brancolini is a youth product of Modena, and joined the youth academy of ACF Fiorentina in 2017. Brancolini made his professional debut with Fiorentina in a 4–0 Serie A win over Bologna on 29 June 2020.

On 5 June 2022, Brancolini signed a five-year contract with Lecce.

References

External links

 FIGC U17
 FIGC U18
 FIGC U19

2001 births
Living people
Sportspeople from Modena
Italian footballers
Italy youth international footballers
Association football goalkeepers
ACF Fiorentina players
U.S. Lecce players
Serie A players
Footballers from Emilia-Romagna